Kasa-Vubu is a municipality (commune) in the Funa district of Kinshasa, the capital city of the Democratic Republic of the Congo.

Along with Kalamu, it forms the historical African heart of Kinshasa. Formerly known as Dendale, the town's name derives from the first president of the Congo after independence, Joseph Kasa-Vubu, who was elected mayor of the commune in 1957.

Demographics

References

See also

Communes of Kinshasa
Funa District